Frontstalag 133 was a temporary German prisoner-of-war camp during World War II located near Rennes in German-occupied northern France. It operated from late 1940 to October 1943. It housed prisoners from French Colonial Forces.

About 200 of the captured British Commando troops from the St. Nazaire Raid were taken there, then sent on to other camps in Germany.

See also
 St. Nazaire Raid

Sources
  POW camps in France
  Story of James Laurie, taken  POW

World War II prisoner of war camps in Germany
World War II prisoner-of-war camps in France